Donacia texana is a species of aquatic leaf beetle in the family Chrysomelidae. It is found across most of eastern North America, from Texas to Ontario and south to Florida.

References

Further reading

 NCBI Taxonomy Browser, Donacia texana
 Arnett, R. H. Jr., M. C. Thomas, P. E. Skelley and J. H. Frank. (eds.). (21 June 2002). American Beetles, Volume II: Polyphaga: Scarabaeoidea through Curculionoidea. CRC Press LLC, Boca Raton, Florida .
 Arnett, Ross H. (2000). American Insects: A Handbook of the Insects of America North of Mexico. CRC Press.
 Richard E. White. (1983). Peterson Field Guides: Beetles. Houghton Mifflin Company.

Donaciinae
Beetles described in 1873